Margate City is a city in Atlantic County, in the U.S. state of New Jersey. As of the 2020 United States census, the city's population was 5,317, a decrease of 1,037 (−16.3%) from the 2010 census count of 6,354, which in turn reflected a decline of 1,839 (−22.4%) from the 8,193 counted in the 2000 census.

Margate City was originally incorporated as the borough of South Atlantic City by an act of the New Jersey Legislature on September 7, 1885, from portions of Egg Harbor Township, based on the results of a referendum held on August 1, 1885. South Atlantic City was reincorporated as a city on April 23, 1897, and then reincorporated with the name Margate City on April 20, 1909. The city was named for Margate in Kent, England.

The city stretches about eight blocks from the Atlantic Ocean to the bay at most points in town. Margate is a popular Jersey Shore destination, especially during the summer, and is the home of Lucy the Elephant, a  wooden elephant, and of Marven Gardens, of Monopoly board game fame.

Geography

According to the United States Census Bureau, the city had a total area of 1.63 square miles (4.22 km2), including 1.42 square miles (3.67 km2) of land and 0.22 square miles (0.56 km2) of water (13.19%).

Margate City borders Longport and Ventnor City.

Demographics

2010 census

The Census Bureau's 2006–2010 American Community Survey showed that (in 2010 inflation-adjusted dollars) median household income was $66,667 (with a margin of error of +/− $7,735) and the median family income was $90,625 (+/− $6,808). Males had a median income of $81,759 (+/− $13,790) versus $61,179 (+/− $11,593) for females. The per capita income for the borough was $50,328 (+/− $7,450). About 8.4% of families and 9.1% of the population were below the poverty line, including 7.2% of those under age 18 and 8.3% of those age 65 or over.

2000 census
As of the 2000 United States census there were 8,193 people, 3,984 households, and 2,302 families residing in the city. The population density was 2, 243.5/km2 (5,825.4/sq mi). The racial makeup of the city was 95.73% White, 0.87% African American, 0.02% Native American, 1.56% Asian, 0.07% Pacific Islander, 0.92% from other races, and 0.83% from two or more races. Hispanic or Latino of any race were 2.71% of the population.

There were 3,984 households, out of which 16.7% had children under the age of 18 living with them, 46.9% were married couples living together, 8.1% had a female householder with no husband present, and 42.2% were non-families. 36.1% of all households were made up of individuals, and 17.5% had someone living alone who was 65 years of age or older. The average household size was 2.06 and the average family size was 2.67.

In the city the population was spread out, with 15.4% under the age of 18, 4.5% from 18 to 24, 23.4% from 25 to 44, 27.9% from 45 to 64, and 28.9% who were 65 years of age or older. The median age was 50 years. For every 100 females, there were 89.1 males. For every 100 females age 18 and over, there were 86.6 males.

The median income for a household in the city was $45,876, and the median income for a family was $63,917. Males had a median income of $48,152 versus $31,025 for females. The per capita income for the city was $33,566. About 7.0% of families and 7.3% of the population were below the poverty line, including 7.6% of those under age 18 and 5.4% of those age 65 or over.

Parks and recreation

Summer residency

Along with other spots on the Jersey Shore, Margate becomes a popular destination in the summer months. Many houses in Margate are second homes used during the summer, and a considerable number are owned by year-round residents. Unlike in other places, such as Cape May or Ocean City, where many visitors spend a few nights in a hotel, Margate has no hotels, so most of the people who choose this town are regulars. Unlike other area towns such as Ocean City and the municipalities on Long Beach Island, weekly house/condominium rentals are almost non-existent in Margate.

Beaches
Margate's beaches attract surfers, kayaking, and hobie cat sailing.

The Margate beaches are narrower than beaches at many other places at the Jersey Shore. There are few dunes and those that do exist are artificial, having been created to protect beaches from nor'easters and hurricanes. In the wake of Hurricane Sandy, Margate voters will consider a referendum that would allow the city to participate in a program operated by the United States Army Corps of Engineers under which dunes would be constructed on the city's beaches, which would be intended to alleviate beach erosion and provide storm protection to Margate and to adjoining Ventnor City, which has already had a beach protection program in place for the past ten years, under which dunes have already been constructed.

Margate City Beach Patrol operates lifeguard stands and beach patrol operations for the Margate beaches. Lifeguards are on duty during summer months from 10 am to 6 pm, with more limited hours in the late Spring and early Autumn months.

Margate beaches are not free beaches. Beachgoers must purchase a seasonal or weekly tag to enjoy the beach. Seasonal badges can be purchased preseason at a reduced rate.

Marinas and fishing
Margate is host to many bayside docks providing the casual fisherman hours of enjoyment and relaxation. Local charter boats offer sport and deep sea fishing. Margate's many marinas offer docks for lease, equipment rentals, fuel stations and fishing charters.

Attractions

Margate is the home of Lucy the Elephant, the "largest elephant in the world" and is the oldest remaining example of zoomorphic architecture left in the United States. Over 130 years old, she has been painstakingly restored and is toured by thousands of fans each year.

The Margate farmers' market is held every Thursday during summer months. Shoppers can purchase local produce and a variety of fresh fruits and vegetables.

Government

Local government
Margate City has operated under the Walsh Act commission form of municipal government since 1911. The city is one of 30 municipalities (of the 564) statewide that use commission form of government. The governing body is comprised of three commissioners, who are elected at-large to four-year terms of office on a non-partisan basis as part of the May municipal election. Each commissioner is assigned a department to oversee and administer. The Mayor is then selected from among the three elected Commissioners by a vote between them and assigned to the office by resolution.

, members of the Margate City Commission are
Mayor Michael Becker (Commissioner of Public Works, Parks and Public Property),
John F. Amodeo (Commissioner of Public Affairs and Public Safety) and
Maurice "Maury" Blumberg (Commissioner of Revenue and Finance), all of whom are serving concurrent terms of office that end May 16, 2023.

Federal, state and county representation
Margate City is located in the 2nd Congressional District and is part of New Jersey's 2nd state legislative district.

 

Atlantic County is governed by a directly elected county executive and a nine-member Board of County Commissioners, responsible for legislation. The executive serves a four-year term and the commissioners are elected to staggered three-year terms, of which four are elected from the county on an at-large basis and five of the commissioners represent equally populated districts. , Atlantic County's Executive is Republican Dennis Levinson, whose term of office ends December 31, 2023. Members of the Board of County Commissioners are:

Ernest D. Coursey, District 1, including Atlantic City (part), Egg Harbor Township (part), and Pleasantville (D, 2022, Atlantic City), Chair Maureen Kern, District 2, including Atlantic City (part), Egg Harbor Township (part), Linwood, Longport, Margate City, Northfield, Somers Point and Ventnor City (R, 2024, Somers Point), Andrew Parker III, District 3, including Egg Harbor Township (part) and Hamilton Township (part) (R, Egg Harbor Township, 2023), Richard R. Dase, District 4, including Absecon, Brigantine, Galloway Township and Port Republic (R, 2022, Galloway Township), James A. Bertino, District 5, including Buena, Buena Vista Township, Corbin City, Egg Harbor City, Estell Manor, Folsom, Hamilton Township (part), Hammonton, Mullica Township and Weymouth Township (R, 2018, Hammonton), Caren L. Fitzpatrick, At-Large (D, 2023, Linwood), Frank X. Balles, At-Large (R, Pleasantville, 2024) Amy L. Gatto, Freeholder (R, 2022, Hamilton Township) and Vice Chair John W. Risley, At-Large (R, 2023, Egg Harbor Township)

Atlantic County's constitutional officers are: 
County Clerk Joesph J. Giralo (R, 2026, Hammonton), 
Sheriff Eric Scheffler (D, 2024, Northfield) and 
Surrogate James Curcio (R, 2025, Hammonton).

Politics
As of March 2011, there were a total of 4,984 registered voters in Margate City, of which 1,164 (23.4% vs. 30.5% countywide) were registered as Democrats, 2,019 (40.5% vs. 25.2%) were registered as Republicans and 1,798 (36.1% vs. 44.3%) were registered as Unaffiliated. There were 3 voters registered as Libertarians or Greens. Among the city's 2010 Census population, 78.4% (vs. 58.8% in Atlantic County) were registered to vote, including 91.2% of those ages 18 and over (vs. 76.6% countywide).

In the 2012 presidential election, Republican Mitt Romney received 1,882 votes (54.1% vs. 41.1% countywide), ahead of Democrat Barack Obama with 1,534 votes (44.1% vs. 57.9%) and other candidates with 21 votes (0.6% vs. 0.9%), among the 3,479 ballots cast by the city's 5,109 registered voters, for a turnout of 68.1% (vs. 65.8% in Atlantic County). In the 2008 presidential election, Republican John McCain received 2,061 votes (52.5% vs. 41.6% countywide), ahead of Democrat Barack Obama with 1,793 votes (45.7% vs. 56.5%) and other candidates with 32 votes (0.8% vs. 1.1%), among the 3,922 ballots cast by the city's 5,515 registered voters, for a turnout of 71.1% (vs. 68.1% in Atlantic County). In the 2004 presidential election, Republican George W. Bush received 2,160 votes (49.5% vs. 46.2% countywide), ahead of Democrat John Kerry with 2,132 votes (48.9% vs. 52.0%) and other candidates with 26 votes (0.6% vs. 0.8%), among the 4,362 ballots cast by the city's 5,697 registered voters, for a turnout of 76.6% (vs. 69.8% in the whole county).

In the 2013 gubernatorial election, Republican Chris Christie received 1,850 votes (68.9% vs. 60.0% countywide), ahead of Democrat Barbara Buono with 712 votes (26.5% vs. 34.9%) and other candidates with 36 votes (1.3% vs. 1.3%), among the 2,687 ballots cast by the city's 5,127 registered voters, yielding a 52.4% turnout (vs. 41.5% in the county). In the 2009 gubernatorial election, Republican Chris Christie received 1,466 votes (52.7% vs. 47.7% countywide), ahead of Democrat Jon Corzine with 1,145 votes (41.1% vs. 44.5%), Independent Chris Daggett with 123 votes (4.4% vs. 4.8%) and other candidates with 16 votes (0.6% vs. 1.2%), among the 2,784 ballots cast by the city's 5,173 registered voters, yielding a 53.8% turnout (vs. 44.9% in the county).

Education
For kindergarten through eighth grade, public school students attend the Margate City Schools, together with students from Longport Borough, who attend as part of a sending/receiving relationship. As of the 2018–19 school year, the district, comprised of two schools, had an enrollment of 351 students and 48.8 classroom teachers (on an FTE basis), for a student–teacher ratio of 7.2:1. Schools in the district (with 2018–19 enrollment data from the National Center for Education Statistics) are
William H. Ross III Elementary School 169 students in grades K–4 and
Eugene A. Tighe Middle School with 181 students in grades 5–8. In 2017, Eugene A. Tighe Middle School was awarded a National Blue Ribbon from the United States Department of Education.

For ninth through twelfth grades, public school students from Margate attend Atlantic City High School in Atlantic City, which also serves students from Brigantine and Ventnor City who attend the school as part of sending/receiving relationships. As of the 2018–19 school year, the high school had an enrollment of 1,796 students and 153.0 classroom teachers (on an FTE basis), for a student–teacher ratio of 11.7:1.

City public school students are also eligible to attend the Atlantic County Institute of Technology in the Mays Landing section of Hamilton Township or the Charter-Tech High School for the Performing Arts, located in Somers Point.

Blessed Sacrament Regional School was a Catholic school serving students in grades pre-kindergarten through eighth grade that had been operated in connection with the Blessed Sacrament Church, but was closed by the Roman Catholic Diocese of Camden in June 2008 and merged with St. James of Ventnor to form Holy Family Regional School. Those who wish to attend a Catholic high school choose from Holy Spirit High School, located in Absecon, St. Augustine College Preparatory School located in Richland or Our Lady of Mercy Academy located in Newfield.

Transportation

Roads and highways

No Interstate, U.S. or state highways directly serve Margate City. The most significant roadways are county roads. County Route 563 begins in Margate City and follows Jerome Avenue over the Downbeach Express, a privately owned and operated toll-bridge which connects Margate to the mainland, towards Egg Harbor Township and Northfield. County Route 629 follows Ventnor Avenue northeast toward Ventnor and Atlantic City, and southwest towards Longport and Somers Point.

Public transportation
NJ Transit provides bus service on the 505 route between Longport and Atlantic City.

Climate
According to the Köppen climate classification system, Margate City has a humid subtropical climate (Cfa) with hot, moderately humid summers, cool winters and year-around precipitation. Cfa climates are characterized by all months having an average mean temperature > 32.0 °F (> 0.0 °C), at least four months with an average mean temperature ≥ 50.0 °F (≥ 10.0 °C), at least one month with an average mean temperature ≥ 71.6 °F (≥ 22.0 °C) and no significant precipitation difference between seasons. During the summer months in Margate City, a cooling afternoon sea breeze is present on most days, but episodes of extreme heat and humidity can occur with heat index values ≥ 95 °F (≥ 35 °C). During the winter months, episodes of extreme cold and wind can occur with wind chill values < 0 °F (< −18 °C). The plant hardiness zone at Margate City Beach is 7b with an average annual extreme minimum air temperature of 7.0 °F (−13.9 °C).

Ecology
According to the A. W. Kuchler U.S. potential natural vegetation types, Margate City would have a dominant vegetation type of Northern Cordgrass (73) with a dominant vegetation form of Coastal Prairie (20).

Popular culture
In the 2009 film (500) Days of Summer, Margate is the hometown of the male lead character, Tom Hansen, played by Joseph Gordon-Levitt. One of the screenplay's co-writers, Scott Neustadter, grew up in Margate.

In the 1998 Nicolas Cage mystery/thriller film Snake Eyes, Margate is the main character's place of residence, alluded to as a pleasant suburban town, in contrast to the grittier Atlantic City, which forms the backdrop of the story.

In the third-season finale of Boardwalk Empire, "Margate Sands", the city is referenced as a site of gang violence between the forces of fictionalized Nucky Thompson and his rivals.

The movie Duane Hopwood was filmed at Eugene A. Tighe Middle School and at Maynards Cafe in 2004.

Notable people

People who were born in, residents of, or otherwise closely associated with Margate City include:

 John F. Amodeo (born 1950), politician who served in the New Jersey General Assembly from 2008 to 2014, where he represented the 2nd Legislative District
 Chris Arena (born 1987), singer-songwriter
 Colin Bell (born 1981), member of the New Jersey Senate who represented the 2nd Legislative District
 David Brog (born 1965/1966), former executive director of Christians United for Israel
 Tim Cavanaugh (born 1967), Los Angeles Times editor who is a Margate native and was an MCBP lifeguard
 Micaela Diamond (born 1999), Broadway actor best known for originating the role of Babe (Cher) in The Cher Show
 Nancy Falkow (born 1970), singer / songwriter
 Jennifer Farrell (born 1984), crowned as Miss New Jersey in 2003
 Vince Fumo (born 1943), former member of the Pennsylvania State Senate who was convicted in 2009 on federal corruption charges
 Zulfi Hoxha (born 1992), jihadi, ISIS fighter
 Walter S. Jeffries (1893–1954), represented New Jersey's 2nd congressional district from 1939 to 1941, and was mayor of Margate City from 1931 to 1935
 Red Klotz (1920–2014), former NBA point guard who created the Washington Generals as the team that plays against and tours with the Harlem Globetrotters
 Mary Lacity (born 1963), Walton Professor of Information Systems and Director of the Blockchain Center of Excellence at the University of Arkansas
 Pete Latzo (1902–1968), welterweight boxing champion in 1920s
 Thomas C. McGrath Jr. (1927–1994), represented New Jersey's 2nd congressional district in the United States House of Representatives from 1965 to 1967
 Scott Neustadter (born 1977), Hollywood screenwriter who co-wrote (500) Days of Summer
 Steven P. Perskie (born 1945), former New Jersey Superior Court judge who served in the New Jersey General Assembly and the New Jersey Senate
 Ralph L. Sacco, neurologist, who served as president of the American Heart Association
 Jessica Savitch (1947–1983), television broadcaster and reporter
 Claire Swift (born 1974, class of 1992), politician who has represented 2nd Legislative District in the New Jersey General Assembly since taking office in 2022

References

External links

 Margate City official website
 Marvelous Margate
 Margate City Public Library

 
1885 establishments in New Jersey
Cities in Atlantic County, New Jersey
Jersey Shore communities in Atlantic County
Populated places established in 1885
Walsh Act